Leahy is an Irish surname, originating in Munster, and now found in Cork, Kerry, Limerick, and Tipperary.

It is usually an anglicised form of the Irish language surname Ó Laochdha ("descendant of Laochdha"), which ultimately derives from Old Irish láechda, láech ("warrior-like, pertaining to a warrior") and appears as a personal sobriquet at least as early as the Book of Lismore (circa 1408–11). However, Leahy may also represent an anglicisation of less common names, including Mac Fhlaithimh and Ó Flaithimh, Mac an Leagha, Ó Leathaigh, Ó Liathaigh, Ó Líthe, Ó Laidhe, Ó Laidhigh, Ó Laithimh, Ó'Lathaigh, Ó Laithmhe, Ó Laochdha, Ó Laoi, Ó Laoidhigh, or Ó Laoithe.

Other anglicised forms of the name include Leahey, Lahey, Lahy, Leehy, Leehey, Lahaie, Lahaye, Lehait, Claffey, Laffey, and Lee.

Notable bearers of the name

 Ann Leahy (born 1971), Australian politician
 Bernie Leahy (1908-1978), American footballer.
 Con Leahy (1880–1921), Irish athlete
 Edward Daniel Leahy (1797–1875), Irish painter
 Edward L. Leahy (1886–1953), United States Senator
 Emmett Leahy (1910–1964), American archivist and entrepreneur
 Frank Lahey (1880–1953), surgeon, medical educator, and founder of Boston's Lahey Clinic
 Frank Leahy (1908–1973), American football player and coach, athletics administrator and sports executive
 Georgie Leahy (1938–2017), Irish hurling manager, coach, selector and player
 Grainne Leahy (born 1966), Irish cricketer
 Sir John Leahy (diplomat) (1928–2015), British diplomat
 John Leahy (executive) (born 1950), American businessman, executive at Airbus
 John Leahy  (born 1969), former Irish hurler
 John O'Lahy (executed 5 Jul 1581), sailor, and one of the Wexford Martyrs
 Kevin Leahy (disambiguation)
 Kristine Leahy (born 1986), American television host and former sports reporter
 Luke Leahy (born 1992), English footballer
 Margaret Leahy (1902–1967), British actress
 Michael Leahy (disambiguation)
 Patrick Leahy (disambiguation)
 Peter Leahy (born 1952), Chief of the Australian Army
 Sean Leahy (born 1958), Australian cartoonist
 Sir Terry Leahy (born 1956), English businessman
 Tom Leahy  (1888–1964), Australian rules footballer
 William D. Leahy (1875–1959), American naval officer and ambassador
 William Harrington Leahy (1904–1986), United States Navy admiral
 William P. Leahy (born 1948), President of Boston College

See also
 Leahy (disambiguation)

References

Surnames
Anglicised Irish-language surnames
Surnames of Irish origin